Drumming may refer to:

 the act of playing the drums or other percussion instruments
 Drummer, a musician who plays a drum, drum kit, or drums
 Drumming (Reich), a musical composition written by Steve Reich in 1971 for percussion ensemble
 Drumming (snipe), mechanical sound produced by snipe in the course of aerial courtship displays
 the rapid, repetitive series of strikes of a woodpecker's bill on a tree or other substrate to establish territory or attract a mate
 a mating display of animals such as birds, often in connection with a lek

See also
 Drumming out, an informal military ceremony to dishonorably discharge soldiers
 Drum (disambiguation)